Sangat is a Suburb town of Bathinda City and a municipal council in Bathinda district in the Indian state of Punjab. Sangat is Small commercial hub of area.

Demographics
 India census, Sangat had a population of 5396. Males constitute 53% of the population and females 47%. Sangat has an average literacy rate of 52%, lower than the national average of 59.5%: male literacy is 57%, and female literacy is 47%. In Sangat, 13% of the population is under 6 years of age.

Schools in Sangat Mandi
Sacred Heart Convent School

Clay India International School

Gyan Jyoti Girls College

Sipahi Jaila Singh Vir chakra Government senior secondary school

References

Popular villages

Ghudda, Dhunike, ਬਾਂਡੀ, ਮੁਹਾਲਾਂ, Doomwali, Pathrala, Jassi-Baghwali,Amarpura urf gurthari, Jodhpur Bagga Singh (Phallar), Kotli Sabo

Bathinda
Cities and towns in Bathinda district